Bulgosuchus is an extinct genus of prehistoric amphibians, known from an incomplete mandible and a femur recovered from the Bulgo Sandstone at Long Reef in Sydney, Australia. The mandible is estimated to have been at least one metre long.

See also
 Prehistoric amphibian
 List of prehistoric amphibians

References

Temnospondyls